Steven John Dunning (born May 15, 1949) is an American former professional baseball player. Dunning was the 1st round draft choice by the Cleveland Indians in the 1970 Major League Baseball Draft.

Baseball career
Dunning was born in Denver, Colorado. He was the second player to go straight to the Major Leagues after being drafted without spending a day in the minors.

On May 11, 1971, Dunning had the distinction of hitting a grand slam home run off of Oakland Athletics pitcher Diego Seguí. This remained the last grand slam hit by an American League pitcher until Félix Hernández of the Seattle Mariners accomplished the same feat June 23, 2008 in a game against the New York Mets. 

He was traded from the Indians to the Rangers for Dick Bosman and Ted Ford on May 10, 1973. He went from the Rangers to the Chicago White Sox for Stan Perzanowski on February 25, 1975. He was dealt for a second time within a year, along with Bill Melton from the White Sox to the Angels for Jim Spencer and Morris Nettles on December 11, 1975. After a campaign in which he went 2–6 with a 4.15 earned run average (ERA) in 32 appearances, he was sent along with Tony Scott and Pat Scanlon from the Expos to the St. Louis Cardinals for Bill Greif, Sam Mejías and Ángel Torres on November 8, 1976. All three players coming to St. Louis had spent some of the 1976 season with the Denver Bears which were led by recently-hired Cardinals manager Vern Rapp.

He became an attorney in 1982. His wife Kim was on Tic Tac Dough in 1983 and won over $10K.

References

External links

1949 births
Living people
American expatriate baseball players in Canada
Baseball players from Denver
California Angels players
Cleveland Indians players
Denver Bears players
Hawaii Islanders players
Major League Baseball pitchers
Montreal Expos players
New Orleans Pelicans (baseball) players
Oakland Athletics players
Portland Beavers players
Spokane Indians players
Stanford Cardinal baseball players
Texas Rangers players
Anchorage Glacier Pilots players
Alaska Goldpanners of Fairbanks players